Terry Haydon is a former association football player who represented New Zealand at international level.

Haydon played two official A-international matches for the New Zealand in 1968, scoring in the first, a 5–0 win over Pacific neighbours Fiji on 17 September. His second and final appearance was as a substitute a 1–3 loss  to New Caledonia on 8 October 1968.

References 

Year of birth missing (living people)
Living people
New Zealand association footballers
New Zealand international footballers
Association footballers not categorized by position